Matthew Hall may refer to:

 Matthew Hall (actor) (born 1991), English television actor
 Matthew Hall (boxer) (born 1984), English professional boxer
 Matthew Hall (curler) (born 1997), Canadian curler
 Matthew Hall (figure skater) (born 1970), Canadian figure-skater
 Matthew Hall (swimmer), Australian swimmer, see 2000 Oceania Swimming Championships
 Matthew Hall (writer) (born 1967), English screenwriter and novelist
 Matthew Hall, the real name of the British comedian Harry Hill
 Matthew Hall (cricketer) (born 1981), former English cricketer
 Matthew Hall (footballer) (1884–?), Scottish footballer for Sunderland
 Matthew Hall (sport shooter), represented Northern Ireland at the 2010 Commonwealth Games

See also 
 Matheau Hall (born 1987), American association football player
 Matt Hall (disambiguation)
 Matthews Hall (disambiguation)